Provençals del Poblenou is a neighborhood in the Sant Martí district of Barcelona, Catalonia (Spain).

Neighbourhoods of Barcelona
Sant Martí (district)